Estrone acetate (brand name Hovigal) is a semisynthetic, steroidal estrogen. It is an estrogen ester, specifically, an ester of estrone.

See also
 Hydroxyestrone diacetate
 Estradiol acetate
 Estriol triacetate

References

Abandoned drugs
Acetate esters
Estrogens
Estrone esters